Vidya Balan is an Indian actress known for her work in Hindi films. She made her acting debut in 1995 with the sitcom Hum Paanch, following which she made several unsuccessful attempts at a film career. Vidya then appeared in music videos for Euphoria, Pankaj Udhas, and Shubha Mudgal all directed by Pradeep Sarkar. She had her first film release with a leading role in Goutam Halder's Bengali film Bhalo Theko (2003). In 2005, she played the heroine in Sarkar's Parineeta, an adaptation of Sarat Chandra Chattopadhyay's novel of the same name. Vidya won the Filmfare Award for Best Female Debut for the film. Rajkumar Hirani's Lage Raho Munna Bhai (2006), a successful comedy sequel, saw her play a radio jockey opposite Sanjay Dutt.

Vidya had five releases in 2007. She played a variety of roles in them, including a woman suffering from multiple sclerosis in Mani Ratnam's semi-biographical drama Guru, a single mother in the comedy Heyy Babyy, and a dissociative identity disorder patient in the psychological thriller Bhool Bhulaiyaa. All three films were commercially successful and established her as a leading lady. The following year, she starred opposite Ajay Devgan in the drama Halla Bol (2008) and Shahid Kapoor in the romantic comedy Kismat Konnection (2008), but both failed to find a wide audience.

From 2009 to 2012, Vidya starred in five consecutive films that garnered her critical and commercial success. She played the mother of a child afflicted with progeria in the drama Paa (2009), a seductive widow in the black comedy Ishqiya (2010), and the real-life character of Sabrina Lal in the semi-biographical thriller No One Killed Jessica (2011). For portraying the actress Silk in the biopic The Dirty Picture, Vidya won the National Film Award for Best Actress. She next played a pregnant woman seeking revenge in Kahaani (2012), a thriller directed by Sujoy Ghosh. She was awarded the Filmfare Award for Best Actress for her roles in Paa, The Dirty Picture, and Kahaani, and the Filmfare Critics Award for Best Actress for Ishqiya. 

Vidya failed to replicate this success with her next few releases, although her performance in the thriller Kahaani 2: Durga Rani Singh (2016) was praised. This changed in 2017 when she played a radio jockey in Tumhari Sulu, for which she won another Best Actress Award at Filmfare. Her highest-grossing release came with the drama Mission Mangal (2019). She has since starred in the Amazon Prime Video streaming films Shakuntala Devi (2020), Sherni (2021), and Jalsa (2022). She won another Filmfare Critics Award for Best Actress for playing an Indian Forest Service officer in Sherni.

Film 

All films are in Hindi unless otherwise noted.

Television

Music video appearances

See also 
 List of awards and nominations received by Vidya Balan

References

External links 
 
 Vidya Balan on Bollywood Hungama

Indian filmographies
Actress filmographies